Bluespotted stingray or blue-spotted stingray may refer to several species:

 Neotrygon australiae, Australian bluespotted maskray
 Neotrygon bobwardi, Bob Ward's maskray
 Neotrygon caeruleopunctata, bluespotted maskray
 Neotrygon indica, Indian-Ocean maskray
 Neotrygon kuhlii, Kuhl's stingray
 Neotrygon malaccensis, Malaccan maskray
 Neotrygon moluccensis, Moluccan maskray
 Neotrygon orientale, Oriental bluespotted maskray
 Neotrygon trigonoides, New Caledonian maskray
 Neotrygon vali, Guadalcanal maskray
 Neotrygon varidens, Mahogany maskray 
 Neotrygon westpapuensis, West Papuan maskray
 Taeniura lymma, bluespotted ribbontail ray
 Taeniura lessoni, Oceania fantail ray
 
Neotrygon
Taeniura